Megan McColl (born 15 November 2000) is a Scottish cricketer. In May 2019, she was named in Scotland's squad for the 2019 ICC Women's Qualifier Europe tournament in Spain. She made her Women's Twenty20 International (WT20I) for Scotland against Germany on 26 June 2019. In August 2019, she was named in Scotland's squad for the 2019 Netherlands Women's Quadrangular Series. She played in Scotland's first match of the series, against Thailand on 8 August 2019. Later the same month, she was named in Scotland's squad for the 2019 ICC Women's World Twenty20 Qualifier tournament in Scotland.

In August 2021, McColl was named in Scotland's squad for the 2021 ICC Women's T20 World Cup Europe Qualifier, and in Scotland's final match of the tournament, against France, she took her first five-wicket haul in WT20I cricket. In January 2022, she was named in Scotland's team for the 2022 Commonwealth Games Cricket Qualifier tournament in Malaysia.

References

External links
 

2000 births
Living people
Scottish women cricketers
Scotland women Twenty20 International cricketers
People from Arbroath